Larry K. Kirkenslager (born August 6, 1944) is an American politician who served in the Iowa House of Representatives from the 84th district from 1979 to 1982.

References

1944 births
Living people
Republican Party members of the Iowa House of Representatives